"Seasons (Waiting on You)" is a song by American synthpop band Future Islands. It is the opening track on their fourth studio album Singles, and was released as the album's lead single on February 4, 2014. The song received much critical acclaim, topping The Village Voices annual year-end Pazz & Jop critics' poll and also being named the best track of 2014 by publications such as NME, Pitchfork, and Spin. In 2019, it was named the 34th best song of the 2010s by Pitchfork, and was ranked 94th on Rolling Stones 100 Best Songs of the 2010s.

Critical reception

Accolades

Live performances
The band's performance of the song on Late Show with David Letterman became an internet hit due to frontman Samuel T. Herring's visual and vocal performance, which included elaborate and angular dance moves and death metal-style growls. Herring also put on a similarly unusual performance during the band's performance of the song on Later... with Jools Holland.

Track listing
 7-inch single
 "Seasons (Waiting on You)" – 3:46
 "One Day" – 4:27

 Digital download (remix)
 "Seasons (Waiting on You)" (BADBADNOTGOOD Reinterpretation) – 3:43

Charts

Certifications

Release history

References

2014 singles
2014 songs
4AD singles
Future Islands songs